Spacewarp or Space Warp may refer to:

Entertainment

Toys
 Spacewarp (toy), a 1980s build-it-yourself marble coaster originally sold by Bandai.
 Spacewarp (transformer), a female Decepticon originally based on Jetfire.

Video games
 Spacewarp, a software product by Bug-Byte.
Space Warp (1983 video game), a 1983 fixed shooter arcade game.
 Space Warp, an ASCII game loosely based on Star Trek.

Other media
 "Spacewarp", a 2015 song by Mark Sherry.
 "Space Warp", the 39th episode of Space: 1999.
 "The Invaders from the Space Warp", a story in Detective Comics which introduced Zook.

Science and technology
 Asynchronous SpaceWarp, a framerate smoothing technique used on the Oculus Rift.
 Hyperspace, a method of traveling in science fiction.
 Warp drive a fictitious spacecraft propulsion system.

See also
 Warp (disambiguation)